Lieutenant General Syed Iftikhar Hussain Shah (14 March 1949 – 15 March 2020) was a governor of the Khyber Pakhtunkhwa province of Pakistan.

Early life and education
Syed was born on 14 March 1949 into a family belonging to the Mian (tribe).

Military Career & Later Life
Iftikhar Hussain Shah was commissioned in the Pakistan Army in October 1964 in 30th PMA Long Course and joined an anti-aircraft unit of the Regiment of Artillery. He later joined and graduated from Army Aviation School to become a pilot in the army. In 1993, Iftikhar Hussain Shah served in the ISI as the Deputy DG of the External Wing of the ISI under Lt Gen Javed Ashraf Qazi.  and in 2000 he was promoted to Lieutenant General.

He was close to General Pervez Musharraf and after retiring he served as Governor of Khyber Pakhtunkhwa, Federal Minister for Communications, and served as Pakistani ambassador to Turkey.

He also worked as the Managing Director of the Zulifqarabad Development Authority (ZDA). 

He served as an advisor of the UN to Pakistan.

He joined the political party, Pakistan Tehreek-e-Insaf (PTI) on 21 May 2016.

Personal life
He was married and had three daughters.

Death
He died a day after his 71st birthday on 15 March 2020 in Kohat, Pakistan

References

External links
Profile of Ambassador to Turkey

	

1949 births
2020 deaths
Governors of Khyber Pakhtunkhwa
Pakistani generals
People of Inter-Services Intelligence
Pakistan Tehreek-e-Insaf politicians